MGR Nagaril is a 1991 Indian Tamil-language comedy film directed by Alleppey Ashraf, starring Anand Babu and Sukanya, with Vivek, Charle, Supergood Kannan, Pandiyan, Shankar, Napoleon, S. S. Chandran and Sumithra in supporting roles. It is a remake of the 1990 Malayalam film In Harihar Nagar. The film was released on 12 September 1991.

Plot 
Four men try to impress a new girl in town. When they find out that she is trying to investigate her brother's murder, they start to pretend to be his friends and soon get into more trouble than they can handle.

Cast 
Anand Babu as Mahadevan
Sukanya as Shobana
Vivek as Gopal
Charle as Anand
Supergood Kannan as Ravi
Shankar as Victor
Pandiyan as Siva
Napoleon as John Peter
S. S. Chandran as Shobana's grandfather
Sumithra as Victor's mother

Soundtrack 
The music was composed by S. Balakrishnan.

Reception 
Sundarj of Kalki wrote .

References

External links 
 
 

1990s Tamil-language films
1991 comedy films
1991 films
Films directed by Alleppey Ashraf
Indian comedy films
Super Good Films films
Tamil remakes of Malayalam films